The Fante Confederacy refers either to the alliance of the Fante states in existence at least since the sixteenth century, or it can also refer to the modern Confederation formed in 1868. The Confederation is seen as one of the first and most prominent self-rule movements in Ghana and the entirety of Africa. Its mission was to shake off colonialism and establish a modern free democratic state.

All Fante substates including the Abura, Goamoa, Oguaa, Edina, Ekumfi, Asebu, Edith and many others joined this Union.

Fantes, like all Akans, trace their ancestry to the Old Ghana Empire in present-day Mali. They believe the Akan people migrated further south after the collapse of Old Ghana. The Mfantefo (Fantes) settled in an area around modern day Takyiman in Bono Ahafo. It was from there that their three revered warriors and leaders; Oson, Odapagyan and Obonomankoma led them further south to their current location in the Central Region of Ghana.

Fante expansion
The Fante had long been in the region both inland and on the coast of what is today Ghana. In the sixteenth century, they began to expand along the coastal areas in order to defend from foreign invaders. The establishment of the confederacy was a proclamation of the several small independent kingdoms that made-up the Fante tribes.

The standard explanation has long been that the Fante states were forced to form a confederation by the rapid growth of the Ashanti Confederacy in the early eighteenth century that began to threaten the security of the surrounding region. Sanders argues that the same forces that were driving the expansion and centralisation of the Ashanti, the lucrative trade with the Europeans and the introduction of firearms and other weapons, also fueled the increasing unity of the Fante.

The Fante united and produced a confederacy to be recognised not only by the people of the Gold Coast, but also by the European powers. The confederacy was headed by the Chief of Mankessim, who was given the title of Breyni. It was the obligation of highest Chief to respect the wishes of a council of the leaders of the other major towns. Despite a similar political structure the Fante never managed to become as united as the Ashanti, though their differences were overcome when their kingdoms were under dire threat. During the early eighteenth century the Fante expanded at the expense of smaller neighbouring states eventually annexing the lands of the Asebu, Cabesterra, and Agona. The Fante were allies of the British who supported their efforts against the rival Dutch, who were aligned with the Ashanti. The Fante Confederacy was smaller than the Ashanti, but through their control of the coastal trade and close links with the British, the Fante became the administrators of the entire Gold Coast. The Fante leaders were the best-educated and wealthiest of the people's in the region.

Economy 
The Fante established long-distance maritime trade links with the kingdom of Kongo around the Congo-Angola region. This was accomplished with dugout canoes powered by sails of woven palm fronds.

Conflict with the Ashanti
For the first half of the eighteenth century, the Ashanti were pre-occupied with expanding their confederacy to the north rather than against the stronger coastal groups. The next few decades saw internal disputes within Ashanti. The Fante subsequently intervened, lending material support to rebel groups in Ashanti and offering safe harbour to refugees and dissidents fleeing the Ashanti Confederacy. The Fante introduced laws forbidding the selling of firearms to the Ashanti and curtailing the amount of trade that could pass between over Fante lands, cutting off supplies to the confederacy.

By the early nineteenth century the Ashanti had consolidated the large parts of the middle region under their rule and began to plan for a full-scale invasion of the Fante Confederacy. In 1806 the Ashanti-Fante War began. The British largely confined their role in the conflict to supplying the Fante with military equipment and supplies, continuing a decades-long tradition.

The British continued sometimes to work with the Fante to curtail the Ashanti. With advice from the British in 1811 the Fante again went to war. While defeated in open battle the Fante were able to win the war by forcing the Ashanti to withdraw by employing guerilla tactics. For the next several decades the Fante worked to play the Ashante off against the British while maintaining their independence, over time, however, British influence came to dominate the Fante lands. In 1844 the Fante leaders agreed to a bond with the British that made the area a protectorate of the British, but guaranteed internal control would remain with the local rulers.

Tensions with the Europeans
However, the British soon began to exceed the agreement, and intervened in life along the coast. The Fante leaders were displeased and felt the British were only interested in their trade. The most controversial action was an 1868 agreement between the British and Dutch to trade forts along the coast. Previously the entire coast had been a mix of British and Dutch forts. The British and Dutch governments agreed to exchange forts: the British would control all the forts east of the Kakum River, and the Dutch would get all the forts to the west, including most of those in the Fante areas.

These factors annoyed people throughout the region. Legally the local rulers saw the Europeans as tenants, and they demanded the right to approve the fort exchanges. The local rulers were not even consulted before the agreement was announced. The Fante also worried about the close relations between the Ashanti and the Dutch after fighting both on different flanks for years. The Fante were adept in battle, and stories of their prowess soon spread through Europe.  Fante Asafo battle flags have become prized collectible items in Europe and the Americas. Examples can be found here https://vatican.com/2/Other-Fante-Asafo-Flag, http://www.amatuli.co.za/Blog/ID/22/Fante-Flags and http://www.theconservationcenter.com/articles/2019/6/28/asafo-flags-a-stitch-in-time.

Creation of the Modern Confederacy
This led to an 1868 meeting of the leading Fante Paramount Chiefs and also representatives of their Akan allies Denkyira, Wassa, Twifu and Assin, who met in Mankessim, the traditional Fante Capital Town and formed a Confederation. The Confederate States, due to war with the Dutch and Danish, became allies of the British, but also demanded the right to self-government. They also promised to prevent the Dutch from assuming control of the forts in the area.

The new state had a King-President as its head and below him a council of kings and elders and a national assembly representing a larger portion of the population. King Ghartey IV (c. 1820–1897) of Winneba was elected as the first King-President, while King Nana Amfo Otu Gyandoh I of Abura was placed in charge of the United armed forces. The new government created a standing army of some 15,000 men, introduced a poll tax covering the region, and most importantly a judicial system that asserted the right of the Confederation, not the British, to mete out justice. This Confederation was paralleled in the east by the Ga-led Accra Native Confederation

Amfo Otu the Paramount Chief of Abura Dunkwa and the de facto Defense Secretary and Supreme Commander of the  Fante Army, marched the union forces to Komenda to join that city in its effort to prevent the Dutch from taking control of the fort vacated by the British. This effort was successful and the Dutch were rebuffed. Amfo Otu, one of the Great Fante War Lords, next turned to trying to take Elmina, the centre of Dutch power on the coast. The attempt to storm the city failed and the Fante forces became bogged down in a long war.

In 1871 the constitution was rewritten and a new Executive Council was created. Amfo Otu and Edu of Mankessim were elected co-King-Presidents, but shortly afterward Amfo Otu's role was switched to the General Field Marshal and Edu became the sole King-President.

Weakening of the Confederacy
The Fante Confederacy was substantially weakened by European powers including the British, Dutch and Danish. They saw it as a threat to their control and dominance of Africa. The long fighting around Elmina soon began to drain the resources of the state. It proved unable to collect much of the poll tax, and the British refused to allow the Confederacy to tax lucrative trade in the region. For a time the Ghartey brothers (one of the first indigenous millionaires in Africa)funded the state out-of-pocket, but soon the Confederacy's coffers dwindled. Moreover, the fighting with the Dutch and its allies had left the northern part of the Confederacy, on the border with the Ashanti, undefended and these regions felt the Confederation was failing to provide the needed protection.

Whiles the confederacy waged war against the Dutch in the South West, they also waged war on their Northern Flank with the Ashantis in protecting their vast territory. This proved to be a stretch too far for the state.

British reaction to the Confederacy was mixed. Originally, the British had little interest in directly administering the region themselves and some felt a self-governing European style state was a positive development. However, other British representatives in the region and in London saw the Confederacy as a dangerous precedent that was anti-British and doomed to failure. The Dutch, while winning militarily against the Fante, could little afford to fight a war in West Africa and decided to abandon the entire Gold Coast. The British, now in control of the entire region, approached the leaders of the Confederation and offered them money and also sew distrust among the Fante Paramount Chiefs. This infighting led to the Fante being amalgamated into the Gold Coast around 1873.

See also
List of rulers of the Fante Confederation

References

Sanders, James, "The Expansion of the Fante and the Emergence of Asante in the Eighteenth Century", in Journal of African History, 1979.

External links
 Constitution of the New Fante Confederacy.

Former countries in Africa
States and territories established in 1868
Former confederations